Grassl or Graßl is an Upper German and Austrian family name, mainly widespreaded in the southern region of the Berchtesgadener Land district, especially in the municipalities Ramsau bei Berchtesgaden and Schönau am Königsee. Notable people with the surname include:

Andreas Grassl (born 1984), German man found in England
Daniel Grassl (born 2002), Italian figure skater 
Florian Grassl (born 1980), German skeleton racer
Franz Graßl (born 1965), German ski mountaineer
Judith Graßl (born 1968), German ski mountaineer
Wolfgang Graßl (1970-2010), German skier

German-language surnames